Northside Broadcasting Co-operative Limited (2NSB) - 99.3FM is Sydney's vibrant North Shore community radio station for lovers of great music and local content.

Based in Chatswood, Sydney, Australia, the station operates on the FM 99.3 frequency and is referred to as Northside Radio FM99.3 on-air and for business purposes. 

Northside Radio FM99.3 transmits to Sydney's North Shore, covering the Willoughby, Lane Cove, North Sydney, Mosman and Ku-ring-gai Council areas. 

You can now pick up Northside Radio FM99.3 globally on all good streaming platforms or via the website.

The station is passionate about its community, covering views, news and matters of local interest, and regularly offers a wide variety of great prizes to its listeners and subscribers.

In May 2023, Northside Radio FM99.3 celebrates its 40th anniversary since it first went on air.

Programming 
Northside Radio FM99.3 plays a wide range of Aussie music and genres from soul, funk, jazz and blues to electronic, rock, pop and dance, as well as Latin and world music.

Presenters are able to make their own music selections and bring their own experience and diverse perspectives to the programming.

The Breakfast Shows and afternoon Drive Programs specialise in local community news, and traffic updates as well as great music.

The station also offers programs in languages other than English.

Events 
The station hosts an annual Radiothon, which is the station's main on air funding generator. During Radiothon, Northside Radio FM99.3 offers a multitude of prizes for those who choose to subscribe to the station.  Subscriptions are available for individuals, families, businesses and even pets!  Subscribers are offered discounted tickets to various Northside Radio FM99.3 special events throughout the year.

Northside Radio FM99.3 holds various Outside Broadcasts (OBs) throughout the year, supporting local community events such as The Emerge Festival, The Bobbin Head Classic Charity Bike Ride and The St Ives Food and Wine Festival.

Organisation

The new 2NSB Board Chair for 2022-23 is Gerry Stevens, a weekly Northside program presenter/producer. The current station co-ordinator is Mark Wesley. 

The station is operated by around 70 volunteers many of whom are presenters and/or program producers.

The station is funded by business sponsors, donations and grants as well as passionate subscribers and supporters of the station.

History
The station received its incorporation certificate on 12 October 1981 and began broadcasting in May 1983 from East Chatswood, transmitting to Sydney's North Shore - an area that covers the Willoughby, Lane Cove, North Sydney, Mosman and Ku-ring-gai Council areas. 

The station was originally broadcasting on FM91.5, playing from a jazz-oriented playlist. Following a move to the FM99.3 frequency in 2003, the station was re-branded Rhythm & Jazz, encompassing a range of genres from traditional jazz to smooth jazz, funk, soul, blues and world music.

From January 2010 the station began restructuring its programs and music content to reflect the expressed wishes of the North Shore community. This was confirmed during a 2011 survey of listeners, supporters and subscribers, who asked for more music they couldn’t hear anywhere else, music that was not played on other radio stations and more local news, views and matters of local interest.

A grant in 2014 allowed the station to add a second studio (Studio 2), enabling presenters to broadcast live to air in one studio, while people conducted interviews or recorded programs in the ­other.

Acknowledgement
Northside Broadcasting Cooperative Limited (2NSB FM99.3) would like to acknowledge the Cammeraygal People of the Eora Nation, the traditional custodians of this land where our radio station is situated, and we pay our respects to the Elders both past, present and emerging.

References

External links
 Official website

Northside Radio
Northside Radio
Northside Radio